The RKM code, also referred to as "letter and numeral code for resistance and capacitance values and tolerances", "letter and digit code for resistance and capacitance values and tolerances", or informally as "R notation" is a notation to specify resistor and capacitor values defined in the international standard IEC 60062 (formerly IEC 62) since 1952. Other standards including DIN 40825 (1973), BS 1852 (1975), IS 8186 (1976), and EN 60062 (1993) have also accepted it. The updated IEC 60062:2016, amended in 2019, comprises the most recent release of the standard.

Overview
Originally meant also as part marking code, this shorthand notation is widely used in electrical engineering to denote the values of resistors and capacitors in circuit diagrams and in the production of electronic circuits (for example in bills of material and in silk screens). This method avoids overlooking the decimal separator, which may not be rendered reliably on components or when duplicating documents.

The standards also define a color code for fixed resistors.

Part value code

For brevity, the notation omits to always specify the unit (ohm or farad) explicitly and instead relies on implicit knowledge raised from the usage of specific letters either only for resistors or for capacitors, the case used (uppercase letters are typically used for resistors, lowercase letters for capacitors), a part's appearance, and the context.

The notation also avoids using a decimal separator and replaces it by a letter associated with the prefix symbol for the particular value.

This is not only for brevity (for example when printed on the part or PCB), but also to circumvent the problem that decimal separators tend to "disappear" when photocopying printed circuit diagrams.

The code letters are loosely related to the corresponding SI prefix, but there are several exceptions, where the capitalization differs or alternative letters are used.

For example, 8K2 indicates a resistor value of 8.2 kΩ. Additional zeros imply tighter tolerance, for example 15M0.

When the value can be expressed without the need for a prefix, an "R" is used instead of the decimal separator. For example, 1R2 indicates 1.2 Ω, and 18R indicates 18 Ω.

For resistances, the standard dictates the use of the uppercase letters L (for 10−3), R (for 100 = 1), K (for 103), M (for 106), and G (for 109) to be used instead of the decimal point.

The usage of the letter R instead of the SI unit symbol Ω for ohms stems from the fact that the Greek letter Ω is absent from most older character encodings (though it is present in the now-ubiquitous Unicode) and therefore is sometimes impossible to reproduce, in particular in some CAD/CAM environments. The letter R was chosen because visually it loosely resembles the Ω glyph, and also because it works nicely as a mnemonic for resistance in many languages.

The letters G and T weren't part of the first issue of the standard, which pre-dates the introduction of the SI system (hence the name "RKM code"), but were added after the adoption of the corresponding SI prefixes.

The introduction of the letter L in more recent issues of the standard (instead of an SI prefix m for milli) is justified to maintain the rule of only using uppercase letters for resistances (the otherwise resulting M was already in use for mega).

Similar, the standard prescribes the following lowercase letters for capacitances to be used instead of the decimal point: p (for 10−12), n (for 10−9), µ (for 10−6), m (for 10−3), but uppercase F (for 100 = 1) for farad.

The letters p and n weren't part of the first issue of the standard, but were added after the adoption of the corresponding SI prefixes.

In cases where the Greek letter µ is not available, the standard allows it to be replaced by u (or U, when only uppercase letters are available). This usage of u instead of µ is also in line with ISO 2955 (1974, 1983), DIN 66030 (Vornorm 1973; 1980, 2002), BS 6430 (1983) and Health Level 7 (HL7), which allow the prefix μ to be substituted by the letter u (or U) in circumstances in which only the Latin alphabet is available.

Similar codes

Though non-standard, some manufacturers also use the RKM code to mark inductors with "R" indicating the decimal point in microhenry (e.g. 4R7 for 4.7 μH).

A similar non-standard notation using the unit symbol instead of a decimal separator is sometimes used to indicate voltages (3V3 for 3.3 V, or 1V8 for 1.8 V) in contexts where a decimal separator would be inappropriate (e.g. in signal names or file names).

Tolerance code
Letter code for resistance and capacitance tolerances:

Before the introduction of the RKM code, some of the letters for symmetrical tolerances (viz. G, J, K, M) were already used in US military contexts following the American War Standard (AWS) and Joint Army-Navy Specifications (JAN) since the mid-1940s.

Temperature coefficient code

Letter codes for the temperature coefficient of resistance (TCR):

Production date codes

Twenty-year cycle code
 First character: Year of production in twenty-year cycle
 A = 2030, 2010, 1990, 1970
 B = 2031, 2011, 1991, 1971
 C = 2032, 2012, 1992, 1972
 D = 2033, 2013, 1993, 1973
 E = 2034, 2014, 1994, 1974
 F = 2035, 2015, 1995, 1975
 H = 2036, 2016, 1996, 1976
 J = 2037, 2017, 1997, 1977
 K = 2038, 2018, 1998, 1978
 L = 2039, 2019, 1999, 1979
 M = 2020, 2000, 1980
 N = 2021, 2001, 1981
 P = 2022, 2002, 1982
 R = 2023, 2003, 1983
 S = 2024, 2004, 1984
 T = 2025, 2005, 1985
 U = 2026, 2006, 1986
 V = 2027, 2007, 1987
 W = 2028, 2008, 1988
 X = 2029, 2009, 1989
 Second character: Month of production
 1 to 9 = January to September
 O = October
 N = November
 D = December

Example: J8 = August 2017 (or August 1997)

Some manufacturers also used the production date code as a stand-alone code to indicate the production date of integrated circuits.

Some manufacturers specify a three-character date code with a two-digit week number following the year letter.

IEC 60062 also specifies a four-character  year/week code.

Ten-year cycle code

 First character: Year of production in ten-year cycle
 0 = 2020
 1 = 2021
 2 = 2022, 2012
 3 = 2023, 2013
 4 = 2024, 2014
 5 = 2025, 2015
 6 = 2026, 2016
 7 = 2017
 8 = 2018
 9 = 2019
 Second character: Month of production
 1 to 9 = January to September
 X = October
 Y = November
 Z = December

Example: 78 = August 2017

IEC 60062 also specifies a four-character  year/week code.

Four-year cycle code
IEC 60062 also specifies a single-character four-year cycle year/month code.

Marking codes for E series preferred values

Three-character resistor marking code
For resistances following the (E48 or) E96 series of preferred values, the former EIA-96 as well as IEC 60062:2016 define a special three-character marking code for resistors to be used on small parts. The code consists of two digits denoting one of the "positions" in the series of E96 values followed by a letter indicating the multiplier.

Two-character capacitor marking code
For capacitances following the (E3, E6, E12 or) E24 series of preferred values, the former ANSI/EIA-198-D:1991, ANSI/EIA-198-1-E:1998 and ANSI/EIA-198-1-F:2002 as well as the amendment IEC 60062:2016/AMD1:2019 to IEC 60062 define a special two-character marking code for capacitors for very small parts which leave no room to print any longer codes onto them. The code consists of an uppercase letter denoting the two significant digits of the value followed by a digit indicating the multiplier. The EIA standard also defines a number of lowercase letters to specify a number of values not found in E24.

Corresponding standards
 IEC 62:1952 (aka IEC 60062:1952), first edition, 1952-01-01
 IEC 62:1968 (aka IEC 60062:1968), second edition, 1968-01-01
 IEC 62:1968/AMD1:1968 (aka IEC 60062:1968/AMD1:1968), amended second edition, 1968-12-31
 IEC 62:1974 (aka IEC 60062:1974)
 IEC 62:1974/AMD1:1988 (aka IEC 60062:1974/AMD1:1988), amended third edition, 1988-04-30
 IEC 62:1974/AMD2:1989 (aka IEC 60062:1974/AMD2:1989), amended third edition, 1989-01-01
 IEC 62:1992 (aka IEC 60062:1992), fourth edition, 1992-03-15
 IEC 62:1992/AMD1:1995 (aka IEC 60062:1992/AMD1:1995), amended fourth edition, 1995-06-19
 IEC 60062:2004 (fifth edition, 2004-11-08)
 IEC 60062:2016 (sixth edition, 2016-07-12)
 IEC 60062:2016/COR1:2016 (corrected sixth edition, 2016-12-05)
 IEC 60062:2016/AMD1:2019 (amendment 1, 2019-08-20)
 IEC 60062:2016+AMD1:2019 CSV (consolidated version 6.1, 2019-08-20)
 EN 60062:1993
 EN 60062:1994 (1994-10)
 EN 60062:2005
 EN 60062:2016
 EN 60062:2016/AC:2016-12 (corrected edition)
 EN 60062:2016/A1:2019 (amendment 1)
 BS 1852:1975 (related to IEC 60062:1974)
 BS EN 60062:1994
 BS EN 60062:2005
 BS EN 60062:2016
 DIN 40825:1973-04 (capacitor/resistor value code), DIN 41314:1975-12 (date code)
 DIN IEC 62:1985-12 (aka DIN IEC 60062:1985-12)
 DIN IEC 62:1989-10 (aka DIN IEC 60062:1989-10)
 DIN IEC 62:1990-11 (aka DIN IEC 60062:1990-11)
 DIN IEC 62:1993-03 (aka DIN IEC 60062:1993-03)
 DIN EN 60062:1997-09
 DIN EN 60062:2001-11
 DIN EN 60062:2005-11
 ČSN EN 60062
 DS/EN 60062

 EVS-EN 60062

 (GOST) ГОСТ IEC 60062-2014 (related to IEC 60062-2004)
 ILNAS-EN 60062

 I.S. EN 60062

 NEN EN IEC 60062
 NF EN 60062
 ÖVE/ÖNORM EN 60062
 PN-EN 60062

 prМКС EN 60062

 SN EN 60062
 TS 2932 EN 60062
 UNE-EN 60062

 BIS IS 4114-1967
 IS 8186-1976 (related to IEC 62:1974)
 JIS C 5062
 TGL 31667

See also
 Electronic color code
 SI prefix
 Metric prefix
 Engineering notation
 E notation
 Cifrão (a similar scheme for a currency)
 Fermata (a remotely similar musical notation)

Notes

References

Standards